Thysanozoon is a genus of polyclad flatworms belonging to the family Pseudocerotidae.

Species 

Thysanozoon alagoensis 
Thysanozoon aucklandicum 
Thysanozoon australe 
Thysanozoon brocchii 
Thysanozoon californicum 
Thysanozoon cruciatum 
Thysanozoon discoideum 
Thysanozoon distinctum 
Thysanozoon estacahuitensis 
Thysanozoon flavotuberculatum 
Thysanozoon griseum 
Thysanozoon hawaiiensis 
Thysanozoon huttoni 
Thysanozoon japonicum 
Thysanozoon langi 
Thysanozoon minutum 
Thysanozoon mirtae 
Thysanozoon nigropapillosum 
Thysanozoon nigrum 
Thysanozoon papillosum 
Thysanozoon raphaeli 
Thysanozoon sandiegiense 
Thysanozoon skottsburgi 
Thysanozoon tentaculatum 
Thysanozoon verrucosum 
Thysanozoon vulgare

References 
 WoRMS
 Encyclopedia of Life
  Gwannon

Turbellaria genera